Belmond Road to Mandalay is a river cruiser in Myanmar and formerly known as Burma, that plies the Irrawaddy River, also known as the Ayeyarwady River. Its ports of call include Myanmar’s largest city, Yangon, Bagan, Mandalay and Bhamo. It also visits remote villages and temples close to Myanmar’s border with China.

The launch took place on April 19th 1964 as a river cruiser on the Rhine in Europe. It was completely redesigned and relaunched at Blohm+Voss in Hamburg by Orient-Express Hotels in 1995. In 2014 the company changed its name to Belmond Ltd. and the ship was renamed Belmond Road to Mandalay. As of December, 2022 the cruise service remains inoperative due to on going civil war in Myanmar.

Names of the Ship:
 Nederland (1964–1987)
 Rhine Princess (1988)
 Globus (1989)
 Nederland (1989–1991)
 Elbresidenz (1991–1994)
 Road to Mandalay (1995–2014)
 Belmond Road to Mandalay (2014–)

References

External links 
Official website

Belmond hotels